Jamal Al Haj (born 28 August 1971) is a Lebanese football manager and former player who is the technical director of  club Ahed's youth sector.

Al Haj played for Nejmeh as a midfielder, whom he captained, as well as for the Lebanon national team. He was the Lebanese Premier League top scorer in his debut season, in 1989–90, scoring 12 goals. Al Haj also played for Ahed in 2004.

In 2017 he managed Nejmeh, but was fired two months later. Al Haj took charge of the Lebanon national under-23 team between 2020 and 2021.

Club career 
Al Haj made his debut for Nejmeh under Samir Al Adou, during the 1989–90 Lebanese Premier League. In his debut season, Al Haj was the league's top scorer, with 12 goals, above Fadi Alloush and Yasser Mansour from Tadamon Beirut who had scored eight goals each. He remained at Nejmeh for 14 years, captaining them for a certain period, before moving to Ahed in 2004.

International career 
Al Haj represented the Lebanon national team.

Managerial career 
Al Haj was manager of Lebanese Second Division side Khoyol in 2013. Ahead of the 2017–18 season, Al Haj was appointed head coach of Nejmeh; he was fired two months later. On 12 October 2020, Al Haj was announced head coach of the Lebanon national under-23 team. He resigned on 26 July 2021.

On 3 August 2021, Al Haj was appointed technical director of Ahed's youth sector.

Personal life 
Al Haj has two sons, Youssef (b. 1999) and Ali (b. 2001), who both play football.

Honours

Player
Nejmeh
 Lebanese Premier League: 1999–00, 2001–02, 2003–04
 Lebanese FA Cup: 1996–97, 1997–98
 Lebanese Elite Cup: 1996, 1998, 2001, 2002, 2003
 Lebanese Super Cup: 2000, 2002

Individual
 Lebanese Premier League top goalscorer: 1989–90

See also 
 List of association football families

References

External links 

 
 
 

1971 births
Living people
Lebanese footballers
Association football midfielders
Lebanese Premier League players
Nejmeh SC players
Al Ahed FC players
Lebanon international footballers
Lebanese Premier League top scorers
Lebanese football managers
Lebanese Premier League managers
Al Khoyol FC managers
Nejmeh SC managers
Lebanese Second Division managers